The 1917–18 season was Stoke's third season in the War-time League.

With the start of World War I, all Football League football was cancelled. In its place were formed War Leagues, based on geographical lines rather than based on previous league placement. Stoke contested the Lancashire Section in the Principal Tournament, and the Lancashire Section Secondary Competition Group B. However, none of these were considered to be competitive football, and thus their records are not recognised by the Football League.

Season review
In the Primary Competition of the Lancashire League Stoke finished in 1st place with 48 points whilst in the Secondary Competition they finished 3rd with 6 points. Stoke were in free scoring form this season amassing 106 goals including a 16–0 win over Blackburn Rovers this was followed up by an 8–1 win over Rovers a week later. Stoke also beat teams 9–0 (Burnley), 7–0 (Oldham), 6–0 (Port Vale). Stoke won the Primary Competition and thus competed in the championship decider against Leeds City over two legs. However Leeds won 2–1. Both matches against Leeds drew impressive crowds and gate receipts totalled £918 which went to the National Footballers' War Fund.

Final league table

Lancashire Section Primary Competition

Lancashire Section Secondary Competition Group B

Results

Stoke's score comes first

Legend

Lancashire Section Primary Competition

Lancashire Section Secondary Competition Group B

Championship Decider

Squad statistics

References

Stoke City F.C. seasons
Stoke